An estate village is a village wholly within and part of a private estate. Usually several hundred years old, they are often well preserved by the family that owns the estate. They often have small commercial operations such as pubs, craft shops, and village stores, as well as rented residential housing. The individual properties are maintained and managed by the estate manager and rented individually to residential and commercial tenants.

Some examples of estate villages in Great Britain are:
Abbey St Bathans
Beeley
Berriedale in the Scottish Highlands
Edensor
Elveden
Great Tew
Milton Abbas
Peper Harow
Pilsley
Ripley
Selworthy
Shenton
Tissington
Wells
West Heslerton

Some examples of estate villages in Ireland are:

 Abbeyleix, County Laois
 Adare, County Limerick
 Ballyhaise, County Cavan
 Belleek, County Fermanagh
 Glenarm, County Antrim
 Greyabbey, the Ards, County Down
 Hillsborough, County Down
 Strangford, County Down
 Westport, County Mayo

An example of an estate village in New Zealand is:
Barrhill in the Canterbury region of New Zealand's South Island

References

Types of village